TALA is a hybrid-propellant rocket which is the first of its kind to be developed in the Philippines.

Background
It is designed to propel a Can Satellite (CanSat) around  miles into the atmosphere.

TALA is developed by a team of students and teachers from the St. Cecilia’s College-Cebu. They have been assisted by the government's Department of Science and Technology – Philippine Council on Industry, Energy and Emerging Technology Research and Development (DOST-PCIEERD). DOST-PCIEERD awarded them a research grant in 2018 to develop the hybrid rocket..

Launch
The first launch attempt was conducted on March 11, 2020, at the Mati Airport in Davao Oriental. The rocket launch was scrubbed due to pressure loss in one of its tanks yet rescheduled for launch two days later. However, the team had to return back to Minglanilla, Cebu immediately because of the ongoing heightened restrictions of the Enhanced Community Quarantine (ECQ) brought by the COVID-19 pandemic.

In early 2022, the TALA research team began coordinating with the Philippine Air Force Research and Development Center for the potential launch of the hybrid rocket. TALA is now set to be launched from the Colonel Ernesto Rabina Airbase in Tarlac City in 2023.

References

Hybrid-propellant rockets
Space program of the Philippines